is a 2009 Japanese movie. A rare musical single by an obscure rock band makes a strange voyage through time in a science fiction tale from Japanese filmmaker Yoshihiro Nakamura.

Plot
In 1975, an obscure rock band called Gekirin record a song called "Fish Story" that anticipates the sound of punk rock that's just beginning in New York and London. The band breaks up shortly after "Fish Story" is released due to record company interference, but the song has an ongoing life over the years. The film jumps between decades as the recording plays a role in several seemingly unrelated scenarios: a member of the hospitality staff on a ferry (Mirai Moriyama) wins the heart of a beautiful girl while battling hijackers; Masaru (Gaku Hamada) and his buddies look for women on a lonely and boring evening; a comet heads towards Earth while a strange man in a record store lectures those around him about the impending destruction of the Earth; and how Gekirin came to write the song.

Release
Fish Story received its North American premiere at the 2009 New York Asian Film Festival and the H.R. Giger Award «Narcisse» for the Best Feature Film at the Neuchatel International Fantastic Film Festival (Switzerland).

External links 
 

2009 films
Films directed by Yoshihiro Nakamura
2000s Japanese films